Peltis grossa is a species of beetle belonging to the family Trogossitidae.

It is native to Europe.

Synonym:
 Silpha grossa Linnaeus, 1758 (= basionym)

References

Cleroidea
Taxa named by Carl Linnaeus
Beetles described in 1758